Fighting Through is a 1934 American Western film directed by Harry L. Fraser and starring Reb Russell, Lucille Lund and Yakima Canutt.

Cast
 Reb Russell as Reb Russell
 Lucille Lund as Lucille Lund
 Yakima Canutt as Big Jack Thorne
 Edward Hearn as Lennie Lenihan
 Chester Gan as Wong 
 Steve Clemente as Steve - the Knife Thrower 
 Bill Patton as Bill - Henchman
 Frank McCarroll as Bull - Henchman
 Ben Corbett as Benny - Henchman
 Hank Bell as Hank - Henchman
 Slim Whitaker as Sheriff Slade 
 Jack Jones as Singing Deputy
 Jack Kirk as Jack - Singing Deputy
 Chuck Baldra as Guitar-Playing Deputy
 Nelson McDowell as Parson - Henchman
 Victor Adamson as Henchman
 Hal Taliaferro as Frisco

References

Bibliography
 Michael R. Pitts. Poverty Row Studios, 1929–1940: An Illustrated History of 55 Independent Film Companies, with a Filmography for Each. McFarland & Company, 2005.

External links
 

1934 films
1934 Western (genre) films
1930s English-language films
American Western (genre) films
Films directed by Harry L. Fraser
American black-and-white films
1930s American films